David Jack Holt (August 14, 1927 – November 15, 2003) was an American actor initially groomed at the age of seven to be the male Shirley Temple. After several supporting roles as a juvenile actor in films during the 1930s–1940s, he experienced family stress and left acting by the time he was 25. He subsequently had success as a songwriter, before his death in 2003 at the age of 76.

Early life
Holt was born on August 14, 1927 in Jacksonville, Florida.  Four years later, his sister Betty was born, who also became an actor.  At a young age, Holt's dancing skills so impressed the actor and wit Will Rogers that Rogers purportedly told Holt's mother that if ever they were in Hollywood they should contact him and he would get young David into pictures. Relying on this understanding, Holt's father promptly quit his job with Ford Motors. Intent on holding Rogers to his promise, the Holt family drove to California.  Despite their best efforts, Rogers refused even to see them.

With no income, Holt's father worked as a casual laborer. Holt's mother took Holt to auditions, sometimes sharing transport with Shirley Temple and her mother.  Initially, Holt found it difficult to get acting jobs.  He did, however, get a job as "body double" for Cheeta's chimpanzee predecessor in the 1933 film Tarzan the Fearless and had a small role in the 1933 Our Gang (Little Rascals) comedy Forgotten Babies.

Acting career
At age seven, in 1934, Holt got his acting break in the movie You Belong to Me, a melodrama in which his character's parents dies.  He was now a child star, and Paramount Pictures put him under a long-term contract and promoted him as a male version of Shirley Temple.  Over the next six years, Holt made 20 films, but did not come close to the superstar status set by his friend, Shirley Temple.

Holt was initially cast in the title role in David Copperfield, alongside W. C. Fields' character, Wilkins Micawber.  However, producer David O. Selznick developed misgivings about having an American youngster portray a quintessentially British boy.  When English child actor Freddie Bartholomew became available a couple of weeks into shooting, Holt was let go.  Holt had a prominent role in the 1936 movie Straight from the Shoulder (also known as Johnny Gets His Gun) alongside noted actor Ralph Bellamy.  Holt eventually developed a reputation as a troublemaker, and found himself settling for supporting roles in The Adventures of Tom Sawyer (1939), Beau Geste (1939), and Courage of Lassie (1946) as Elizabeth Taylor's older brother.

He may be best remembered as the older Billy in the 1942 critically and publicly acclaimed film, The Pride of the Yankees, where the 14-year old teenager attends Lou Gehrig Day and shows Lou Gehrig that he can now walk, implying that Gehrig's promised World Series home runs many years ago gave him the determination to overcome his childhood illness. In the poignant scene, his character Billy's eyes well with tears as the terminally ill ballplayer walks away. Author Richard Sandomir writes in his book about the movie's making that Holt actually cried when he was interviewed for the part by MGM studio mogul Samuel Goldwyn, explaining that he had suffered from polio.

In the 1944 film Henry Aldrich, Boy Scout, Holt played an unscrupulous Senior Patrol Leader, Irwin Barrett. His character sabotages a competing troop in a wilderness orienteering competition, almost costing Henry and another Scout their lives. As the dramatic rescue scene unfolds, a repentant Irwin confesses his misdeed and helps save Henry and the other boy.

After outgrowing teenage roles, Holt later starred in a 1949 B-movie melodrama about drug addiction, She Shoulda Said 'No'!. The following year, he had a prominent role in "Never Say Die", a 1950 episode of the Lone Ranger hit television series, playing the kidnapped son of a prison warden.

Later work in music
Holt's stress may have been a source of his troublemaking and his restricted success as an actor.  Holt made more money than his father, who openly expressed his resentment at making so much less income than his prepubescent son.  The production line of movies in which Holt was cast compounded his household stress.  Holt and his family's expenses soon exceeded Holt's income and the family eventually had to rely on soup kitchens. At one point Holt had polio, which he believed was a result of the stress he felt in the studios. Amidst all this, Holt's parents separated.

By the early 1950s, acting parts had dried up and Holt turned to song writing, also having success as a jazz pianist. He composed the music for numerous jazz albums, including several that featured Pete Jolly, and writing "The Christmas Blues" with Sammy Cahn, which was recorded by Dean Martin and eventually used on the 1997 soundtrack of L.A. Confidential.

Personal life and death
Holt married, and had four children: Lamont, Janna, Hayley, and Tina. In the early 1960s, Holt went into the real estate business to take advantage of Southern California's booming real estate market, retiring in 1985 at age 58.

Holt died on November 15, 2003 at age 76 of congestive heart failure in San Juan Capistrano, California, leaving his autobiography The Holts of Hollywood unfinished.

References

Bibliography
 Holmstrom, John (1996). The Moving Picture Boy: An International Encyclopaedia from 1895 to 1995. Norwich, Michael Russell, p. 151.
 Best, Marc (1971). Those Endearing Young Charms: Child Performers of the Screen. South Brunswick and New York: Barnes & Co., p. 111-115.
 Willson, Dixie (1935). Little Hollywood Stars. Akron, OH, and New York: Saalfield Pub. Co.

External links
 
 
 (Deathwatch) David Holt, former child actor, 76

American male child actors
20th-century American male actors
American lyricists
Songwriters from Florida
American male voice actors
Male actors from California
American male dancers
Male actors from Jacksonville, Florida
People from San Juan Capistrano, California
1927 births
2003 deaths
20th-century American musicians
Songwriters from California
20th-century American dancers